The 2009–10 ASC Diaraf season, sometimes as ASC Jaraaf were in the top division of Senegalese football.  They would win their 11th and most recent title and would possess the most number of national championship titles, one more than ASC Jeanne d'Arc which was shared for six years.  They would be placed first in Group B with 21 points, 8 wins and 22 goals, they would win the finals stage, Diaraf lost the first match 1-0 and won 3-1 against NGB ASC Niarry Tally.  They would participate in the 2011 CAF Champions League.

The highest points scored was against ASC Yakaar with 0-6.

Ligue 1
ASC Diaraf participate in Group B during the 2009-10 season.

Match dates not available
ASC Diaraf participated in Group B during the 2009-10 season.

Home matches:
ASC Diaraf - Casa Sports 2-0
ASC Diaraf - US Gorée 1-0
ASC Diaraf - Guédiawaye FC 3-0
ASC Diaraf - US Ouakam 0-0
ASC Diaraf - AS Pikine 0-0
ASC Diaraf - ASC Saloum 3-0
ASC Diaraf - ASC Yakaar 6-0
ASC Diaraf - Renaissance sportive de Yoff 1-1

Away matches:
Casa Ports - ASC Diaraf 0-3
US Gorée - ASC Diaraf 1-1
Guédiawaye FC - ASC Diaraf 0-0
US Ouakam - ASC Diaraf 1-0
AS Pikine - ASC Diaraf 0-1
ASC Saloum - ASC Diaraf 0-1
ASC Yakaar - ASC Diaraf 0-0
Renaissance sportive de Yoff - ASC Diaraf 0-0

Finals
NGB ASC Niarry Tally - ASC Diaraf 1-0
ASC Diaraf - NGB ASC Niarry Tally 3-1

League Cup (Coupe de la Ligue)
Diaraf appeared in their second League Cup, the club defeated Dakar UC 0-1 in the first round and succeeded beyond the first round for the first time and defeated three other clubs on the way, RS Yoff 3-0 in 1/8 final, CSS Richard-Toll in the quarter-finals and ASC Port Autonome 2-0 in the semis which brought Diaraf to the final match for the first time.  Diaraf lost the final to Casa Sport 1-2.  Diaraf was ranked second place, their highest in any of the country's League Cup.

CAF Confederation Cup
As Diaraf won their 14th title for the 2009 cup season, the club played at the 2010 CAF Confederation Cup, they only faced Morocco's FUS Rabat, Diaraf won 2-1 in the first match and lost the away match 2-0, Diaraf scored two goals in two of its matches while FUS Rabat scored three.

Squad

Partial squad listing as of mid-2010:
 Abdoul Ahat Fall
 Dieylani Fall
 Mor Soumaré

Team kit

|

|

Player statistics
Abdoul Ahat Fall - 6 goals

References

ASC Jaraaf
2009–10 in Senegalese football